Arhopala micale, the common oakblue or shining oakblue, is a butterfly of the family Lycaenidae. The species comprises about 16 subspecies, which are found in Melanesia and New Guinea as well as the north coast of Australia (see subspecies section).

The wingspan is about 40 mm.

The larvae feed on Buchanania arborescens, Cordia dichotoma, Calophyllum inophyllum, Terminalia muelleri, Glochidion ferdinandi, Cryptocarya hypospodia, Lagerstroemia speciosa, Hibiscus tiliaceus, Acmena, Cupaniopsis anacardioides, Heritiera littoralis and Oxera splendida. They are attended by the ant species Oecophylla smaragdina. When not feeding, the larvae rest in a curled leaf or the entrance to the ants' nest.

Subspecies
 A. m. micale (southern New Guinea to Papua, Manam Island, Fergusson Island, Yule Island)
 A. m. amphis (Australia, from Cooktown to Yeppoon)
 A. m. amytis (Thursday Island, Cape York)
 A. m. amydon (Groote Eylandt, Murray Island, Darwin)
 A. m. superba (Bachan, Halmahera, Morotai, Ternate)
 A. m. obina (Obi)
 A. m. acerba (Goram)
 A. m. leptines (Kai Island)
 A. m. ribbei (Aru)
 A. m. selymbria (Waigeu)
 A. m. bosnika (Biak)
 A. m. jona (Mioswar, Jobi, Noemfoor Island)
 A. m. novaeguineae (western West Irian)
 A. m. centra (northern New Guinea, north-eastern New Guinea, Karkar Island)
 A. m. cidona (Trobriand Island, Woodlark)
 A. m. riuna (Riu, Tagula, Yela, St. Aignan Island)

External links
Australian Insects

Arhopala
Butterflies of Oceania
Butterflies described in 1853
Taxa named by Émile Blanchard